Deh Tall or Deh-e Tall or Deh Tal or Deh Tol or Deh-e Tol or Dehtal may refer to:
 Deh Tall, Manj, Lordegan County, Chaharmahal and Bakhtiari Province
 Deh Tall, Hormozgan
 Deh-e Tol, Kohgiluyeh and Boyer-Ahmad
 Deh Tall Rural District, in Hormozgan Province